Elmahjer is a Syrian sub-district that administratively belonged to Al Quneitra Governorate.

References 

Quneitra Governorate